Ibrahim Mohamed Al-Ouiran (born 28 November 1962) is a Saudi Arabian athlete. He competed in the men's discus throw at the 1988 Summer Olympics.

References

1962 births
Living people
Athletes (track and field) at the 1988 Summer Olympics
Saudi Arabian male discus throwers
Olympic athletes of Saudi Arabia
Place of birth missing (living people)